Benjamin Lacy may refer to:
Benjamin W. Lacy (1839–1895), Virginia politician and jurist
Benjamin R. Lacy (1854–1929), North Carolina politician